Mark, Mary & Some Other People is a 2021 American comedy film, written, directed, and produced by Hannah Marks. It stars Hayley Law, Ben Rosenfield, Odessa A'zion, Nik Dodani, Matt Shively, Sofia Bryant, Gillian Jacobs, Joe Lo Truglio, Steve Little, Kelli Berglund, Haley Ramm, Peter Williams and Lea Thompson.

It had its world premiere at the Tribeca Film Festival on June 10, 2021.

Cast
 Hayley Law as Mary
 Ben Rosenfield as Mark
 Odessa A'zion as Lana
 Nik Dodani as Kyle
 Matt Shively as AJ
 Sofia Bryant as Tori
 Gillian Jacobs as Dr. Jacobs
 Joe Lo Truglio as Chris
 Steve Little as Officiant 
 Kelli Berglund as Bunny
 Haley Ramm as Alexandra
 Peter Williams as Aaron
 Lea Thompson as Aunty Carol
 Maggie Wheeler as Lisa
 Esther Povitsky as Esther

Production
In February 2020, it was announced Hayley Law, Ben Rosenfield, Odessa A'zion, Nik Dodani, Matt Shively, Sofia Bryant, Gillian Jacobs, Joe Lo Truglio, Steve Little, Kelli Berglund, Maggie Wheeler, Haley Ramm, Peter Williams and Lea Thompson had joined the cast of the film, with Hannah Marks directing from a screenplay she wrote.

Principal photography began in December 2019.

Release
It had its world premiere at the Tribeca Film Festival on June 10, 2021. Prior to, Vertical Entertainment acquired distribution rights to the film.

Soundtrack 
The rock band Green Day confirmed that their single Holy Toledo! was used for the movie, via Instagram.

Reception
Rotten Tomatoes reported an approval rating of 57% based on 21 reviews with an average rating of 6.3/10. The website's critics consensus reads, "Mark, Mary & Some Other People offers an amusing enough diversion for rom-com fans, albeit one that starts strong and fades at the finish."

References

External links
 
 
 
 

American comedy films
American independent films
2021 comedy films
2021 independent films
2020s English-language films
Films directed by Hannah Marks
2020s American films